NBA Action '95: Starring David Robinson is a video game developed by American studio Double Diamond Sports and published by Sega for the Sega Genesis.

Gameplay
NBA Action '95 is a basketball game featuring complete player rosters for all 27 NBA teams, and allows for playing the full season with playoffs and finals, and includes a trade option.

Reception
Next Generation reviewed the game, rating it two stars out of five, and stated that "the small players and generic animation leave this game more than just a bucket short of the playoffs."

Reviews
GamePro (May, 1995)
Electronic Gaming Monthly (Jun, 1995)
Video Games & Computer Entertainment - Apr, 1995
Mega Play

References

1994 video games
Basketball video games
Sega Genesis games
Sega Genesis-only games
Video games based on real people
Video games developed in the United States
Video games scored by Andy Armer